Jerry L. Mitchell (born June 18, 1942) is a former Republican member of the Illinois House of Representatives, representing the 90th district from 1995 to 2012.

External links
Illinois General Assembly - Representative Jerry L. Mitchell (R) 90th District official IL House website
Bills Committees
Project Vote Smart - Representative Jerry L. Mitchell (IL) profile
Follow the Money - Jerry L. Mitchell
2006 2004 2002 2000 1998 1996 campaign contributions
Illinois House Republican Caucus - Gerald L. "Jerry" Mitchell profile

1942 births
Living people
Republican Party members of the Illinois House of Representatives
People from Jacksonville, Illinois
21st-century American politicians